Chance Kelly is an American film and television actor who portrayed NFL Coach Mike Martz in the film American Underdog (2021). He also played Detective Ed Cutler on the NBC series Aquarius. He is also known for starring as Lt. Col. "Godfather" Ferrando in the 2008 HBO miniseries Generation Kill, Mitchell Loeb in the Fox television series Fringe, and Randall Watts in the Cinemax television series Banshee.

Early life

After playing football at Ithaca College, Kelly transferred to New York University where he earned a BA in English and Writing, with the intention of pursuing a career as a writer. But, after losing a bet and in spite of a profound fear of public speaking, he entered an acting class. He was so terrified that he gave his first monologue (Brick from Cat on a Hot Tin Roof) to a brick wall.

Career
While pursuing his acting career, Chance also entered the amateur boxing circuit in NYC, winning the super heavyweight division of the NYC Metros tournament. The following year, he entered the NYC Golden Gloves, winning his first fight by knockout, only to have to subsequently drop out of the competition for work on the film The Devil's Own. A few years later, he also earned an MS from Columbia University. He played Lt. Col. Stephen "Godfather" Ferrando in HBO's Generation Kill. After reading the book upon which the adaptation was based, Kelly embarked on a five-month shoot in Africa, from May to December 2007. He also developed a unique, raspy voice for the role. The Boston Globe praised the "fierce edge" Kelly's performance brought to the series, opining, "Godfather leads with the competitive fury of a high school football coach. His eyes are cold fire, and Kelly, like a few other members of this cast, deserves notice at Emmy time next year." On Memorial Day 2009, he was appointed Honorary Marine by the Marine Corps League (Cpl. Philip A. Reynolds Detachment - 203, Freehold, New Jersey) for his work in Generation Kill.

Kelly appeared in the first season of the science fiction series Fringe as Agent Mitchell Loeb, beginning with the episode "In Which We Meet Mr. Jones". He portrayed Bart McDade, President and COO of Lehman Brothers, in the HBO film Too Big to Fail. Kelly appears as a mysterious interrogator in the American television series Homeland. He has also played recurring characters on For Life (ABC), Power (Starz), Banshee (Cinemax), House of Cards (Netflix), Legends (TNT), Hostages (CBS), Army Wives, The Whole Truth, Delocated, Rescue Me, and The Black Donnellys.  Additionally, he has also guest starred on The Blacklist (NBC), Alpha House (Amazon), Motive, Nikita, Burn Notice & The Jury, NYC 22, Blue Bloods, Unforgettable,  Body of Proof,  Ray Donovan, Golden Boy, and Blindspot. He played the disturbing "Orange Suit Man" in M. Night Shyamalan's film Unbreakable.  He has also appeared in the feature films American Sniper, Little Children, The Taking of Pelham 123, Stake Land, and Broken City.

Kelly has the singular honor of portraying seven different characters on seven different Law & Order episodes between 2002 and 2011: Court Officer #1 (Law & Order: Criminal Intent episode #115 "Semi Professional" 2002); Det. Finch (Law & Order: Criminal Intent episode #318 "Ill Bred" 2004); Kyle Marsden (Law & Order: episode #1503 "The Brotherhood" 2004); Fireman Charlie Hugo (Law & Order: Criminal Intent episode #604 "Maltese Cross" 2006); State Trooper Lawley (Law & Order: SVU episode #819 "Florida" 2007); Elvis Howell (Law & Order: Criminal Intent episode #910 "Disciple" 2010); and Sergeant Forde (Law & Order: Los Angeles episode #113 "Reseda" 2011). (He was actually cast as an eighth character in 2014 when he had to leave New York to shoot the series Aquarius in Los Angeles.) In 2022 he again played a different Law & Order character, portraying Duke Baker (Law & Order: SVU episode #2312 "Tommy Bakers Hardest Fight" 2022)

Chance portrayed Coach Mike Martz in the feature film American Underdog: The Kurt Warner Story Martz was the Offensive Coordinator responsible for "The Greatest Show on Turf" via which un-drafted free agent quarterback Kurt Warner led the Rams to a Super Bowl victory in Super Bowl XXXIV his first year with the team. Warner is the only un-drafted player to win either the league MVP or the Super Bowl MVP. Warner won both that same year.

Chance's podcast ISLAND  illustrates the incredible first 300 years of colonization in and around Manhattan island. The program covers 1609-1909 "Hudson to Hearst" and is available on Apple Podcasts, Spotify, Google, Pandora and Stitcher, among others: https://www.thepodcastisland.com

Personal life
Chance Kelly's maternal grandfather was screenwriter William Fay (Kid Galahad, Alfred Hitchcock Presents, Schlitz Playhouse).

Chance Kelly's great, great, great Uncle was Honest John Kelly. John Kelly was one of the first Irish-Catholics to be elected in U.S. Congress in 1856. He would go on to become Sheriff of New York, and later take over and re-organize Tammany Hall in the wake of the Boss Tweed era. John Kelly was a fierce defender of the rights of New York immigrants from all parts of the world. He is entombed beneath the Basilica of Old St. Patrick's Cathedral on Mulberry Street in NYC, where he and the venerable Pierre Toussaint were fellow parishioners.

Chance Kelly holds a BA from New York University and an MS from Columbia University.

Filmography

Film

Television

Video games

References

External links

1967 births
American male film actors
American male television actors
American male voice actors
New York University alumni
Columbia University alumni
Male actors from New Rochelle, New York
Living people
20th-century American male actors
21st-century American male actors